St. Louis-style barbecue refers to spare ribs associated with the St. Louis area. These are usually grilled rather than slow-cooked over indirect heat with smoke which is typically associated with the term "barbecue" in the United States. Often overshadowed by its more famous cousin, Kansas City-style barbecue, St. Louis-style barbecue struggles to distinguish itself from other city based styles of barbecue. Although St. Louis-style barbecue takes inspiration from other styles of barbecue it still retains its own distinct style.

Popularity 
Barbecue in St. Louis is incredibly popular and is a part of general St. Louis culture. There are many famous and award winning barbecue restaurants based in St. Louis, like Salt & Smoke, Sugarfire Smokehouse, and BEAST Craft BBQ Co. which was named the best barbecue in Illinois by Food & Wine. Sugarfire Smokehouse popularized St. Louis-style barbecue. They have 13 locations located in Missouri, Colorado, Indiana, Illinois, and Kentucky. St. Louis is host to a thriving barbecue culture, with many barbecue competitions throughout the year. St. Louis-style ribs are often a class entry in barbecue competitions.

History
The ribs are often heavily sauced; St. Louis is said to consume more barbecue sauce per capita than any other city in the United States.  St. Louis-style barbecue sauce is described by author Steven Raichlen as a "very sweet, slightly acidic, sticky, tomato-based barbecue sauce usually made without liquid smoke."

St. Louis-style spare ribs are cut in a particular way with the sternum bone, cartilage and rib tips removed so that a well-formed, rectangular-shaped rack is created for presentation. This cut of ribs, formalized by the USDA as "Pork Ribs, St. Louis Style," allegedly originated with numerous meat-packing plants located in the region in the mid-20th century and put into the policy by a diehard fan of the St. Louis Cardinals baseball team. Butchers after World War 2 employed this cut because it eliminated much of the fat and gristle and they could charge a premium for it. This cutting technique eventually gained popularity as local meatpackers realized they could advertise the cut as St. Louis-style ribs and differentiate themselves from competitors.

See also

St. Louis cuisine
Kansas City-style barbecue
List of regional dishes of the United States
Maull's barbecue sauce
Sandwiches That You Will Like
List of pork dishes

References

External links
 St. Louis Style Ribs vs. Baby Back Ribs
 The geography of American barbecue
 How to Trim Pork Spareribs Into a St. Louis-Style Cut
 BBQ Anatomy 101: Pork Ribs
St. Louis BBQ Society

Barbecue
Pork dishes
Cuisine of the Midwestern United States
Cuisine of St. Louis